Robert Strange (December 6, 1857 – August 23, 1914) was second bishop of the Episcopal Diocese of East Carolina, serving from 1905 to 1913.

Early life and education
Strange was born in Wilmington, North Carolina on December 6, 1857, the son of Robert Strange, a lawyer and army officer, and Caroline Wright. He was also the grandson of Judge and Senator Robert Strange. He was baptized in St James's Church in Wilmington, North Carolina. He studied at the University of North Carolina and graduated with a Bachelor of Arts in 1879, also receiving the debater's medal. He then studied at Berkeley Divinity School and graduated in 1883.

Ordained Ministry
In April 1884, he was ordained deacon by Bishop Alfred A. Watson, of East Carolina and priest on November 15, 1885 by Bishop Theodore B. Lyman of North Carolina. He served as a missionary at Lawrenceville, Virginia between 1884 and 1885. He then became rector of the Church of the Good Shepherd in Raleigh, North Carolina, while in 1887 he became rector of St James's Church in Wilmington, North Carolina. In 1900 he transferred to Richmond, Virginia to become rector of St Paul's Church.

Bishop
On May 26, 1904, Strange was elected Coadjutor Bishop of East Carolina and was consecrated on November 1, 1904 in St James's Church by the Bishop of South Carolina Ellison Capers. He succeeded as diocesan bishop in April 1905 and retained the post till his death in 1914.

References 

1857 births
1914 deaths
19th-century American Episcopalians
People from Wilmington, North Carolina
University of North Carolina alumni
Yale Divinity School alumni
Episcopal bishops of East Carolina